Grand Marsh is an unincorporated census-designated place located in Adams County, Wisconsin, United States. The community is southeast of Adams, in the town of New Chester. Grand Marsh has a post office with ZIP code 53936, which opened in 1850. As of the 2010 census, its population is 127.

The community took its name from the surrounding wetlands.

References

Census-designated places in Adams County, Wisconsin
Census-designated places in Wisconsin